Dudley is a city in Laurens County, Georgia, United States. The population was 571 at the 2010 census, up from 447 in 2000. It is part of the Dublin Micropolitan Statistical Area.

History
Dudley had its start in 1891 when the railroad was extended to that point. The city was named for Senator Dudley Mays Hughes.

Geography 

Dudley is located in western Laurens County at  (32.538345, -83.076179). U.S. Route 80 passes just north of the center of town, leading east  to Dublin, the county seat, and west  to Montrose. Interstate 16 passes through the south end of the city, with access from Exit 42. I-16 leads northwest  to Macon and east  to Savannah.

The north side of the town drains to Turkey Creek, an east-flowing tributary of the Oconee River, and the south side drains via Little Rocky Creek to Rocky Creek, a tributary of Turkey Creek.

Education
Northwest Laurens Elementary School, a part of Laurens County Schools, is located in Dudley.

Miscellany

Dudley offers a membership community center complete with in-ground pool and tennis courts.

Demographics

2020 census

As of the 2020 United States census, there were 593 people, 273 households, and 196 families residing in the city.

2000 census
As of the census of 2000, there were 447 people, 189 households, and 130 families residing in the city. The racial makeup of the city was 84.79% White, 13.65% African American, and 1.57% from two or more races. Hispanic or Latino of any race were 0.22% of the population.

There were 189 households, out of which 28.6% had children under the age of 18 living with them, 58.2% were married couples living together, 10.1% had a female householder with no husband present, and 30.7% were non-families. 29.6% of all households were made up of individuals, and 13.8% had someone living alone who was 65 years of age or older.  The average household size was 2.37 and the average family size was 2.92.

In the city, the population was spread out, with 22.6% under the age of 18, 7.2% from 18 to 24, 32.0% from 25 to 44, 23.0% from 45 to 64, and 15.2% who were 65 years of age or older.  The median age was 38 years. For every 100 females, there were 88.6 males.  For every 100 females age 18 and over, there were 79.3 males.

The median income for a household in the city was $41,442, and the median income for a family was $48,750. Males had a median income of $40,893 versus $26,000 for females. The per capita income for the city was $19,803.  About 11.5% of families and 12.0% of the population were below the poverty line, including 16.5% of those under age 18 and 16.7% of those age 65 or over.

References 

Cities in Georgia (U.S. state)
Cities in Laurens County, Georgia
Dublin, Georgia micropolitan area